is a railway station operated by Kurobe Gorge Railway in Kurobe, Toyama Prefecture, Japan.

Station overview 

Kuronagi Station is a staffed station and has a single side platform. The station is located above a steep gorge above the Kuronagi River, a tributary of the Kurobe River.

Kuronagi Station is a short hike away from Kuronagi Onsen.

Adjacent stations

References

External links
  

Railway stations in Japan opened in 1953
Railway stations in Toyama Prefecture